Australian pop vocal group Human Nature has released thirteen studio albums, three compilation albums, five video albums, one extended play (EP), twenty-two singles and thirty-two music videos.

Albums

Studio albums

Compilation albums

Box sets

Extended plays

Singles

Music videos

Video albums

Notes

References

Discographies of Australian artists
Pop music group discographies